Malka Mari is a settlement in Kenya's Mandera County (former North Eastern Province). Owed to its high concentration of wildlife, Malka Mari National Park was gazetted in the year 1989. The park is situated along the Kenya-Ethiopia border along the Daua River. The river is in the extreme north eastern part of the country on the Mandera plateau. The climate in Malka Mari National Park is hot and dry, implying that the area scrubby and semi arid grassland is dominant. The Daua River is surrounded by palms and riparian woodland.

The major attractions of the Malka Mari National Park include Malkamari fort, valleys and hills. These physical features provide beautiful and attractive scenery, a worthwhile experience for tourists and visitors. Perhaps Malka Mari National Park can be considered as the most remote national park in Kenya.

There has been no permanent human settlements owing to the very arid and inhospitable climate of the region. The common inhabitants of the park are nomadic herders of the Gurreh community, though they are few in number and mostly dispersed over a wide region. Karache Urane is located at the southern end of Malka Mari National Park. The Southern part on the other hand hosts the Awara Plains. The boundary of the park to the north terminates on the Kenya-Ethiopia border. Therefore the extreme ends of Malka Mari National Park can serve as major tourist attraction sites.

Visitors should be informed that it is extremely difficult and such a long journey to get to Malka Mari National Park by road. The first step is to take the A2 route of the Northern Road to Isiolo and then proceed to Moyale found on the Ethiopian border. From Moyale, you take the D504 road on the eastern side through the Yabdus and Sara hills for around 160 kilometers before reaching Banissa, a semi-permanent village that hosts an airstrip.

Another alternative route that drivers may opt to take is that of Wajir. There are two roads leading to Wajir. The first one is along B9 from Mado Gashi while the second route is from Dadaab at the north eastern part of Garissa, and then proceeds along the B9 route to Tarba. A visitor should proceed further north for about 200 kilometers along d500 prior to reaching Banissa.

Owed to the long distance as well as the poor road conditions at the north eastern part of the country, visitors should consider another alternative means to reach Malka Mari National Park. The best option that a visitor should consider is to charter a plane. There are two airstrips that can be used as a means of arriving at Malka Mari National Park. The first airstrip is located at Bannissa while the second one is a small airstrip that is situated in the park.

Visitors should not worry about their stay at Malka Mari National Park. The attractive scenery as well as a wide range of species of wild animals that Malka Mari National Park hosts is a good reason for tourist to make a point of visiting the place while in Kenya.

The Malka Mari Massacre

Post independence, in the late 70s, the Kenyan Military carried out one of the largest and brutal massacres in Kenya in Malika Mari.  After a military vehicle was burned along the Kenya-Ethiopia border, the Kenyan military decided to undertake collective punishment to the local community, despite the locals claiming the action was perpetrated by armed Ethiopian militia. In what came to be known as the Malka Mari Massacre, the Kenyan military detained over two hundred men and stoned them to death in 1982. None of the men was armed, and the military did not fire a shot. Other reports from The Truth, Justice and Reconciliation Commission heard claim that security personnel killed 336 people and permanently disabled others. There were reports of women being raped and those hiding to escape torture dying from hunger in the bush.

References 

Populated places in Eastern Province (Kenya)
Mandera County